Rakentai is a settlement in Kiribati.  It is located on an atoll; Rotuma and Autukia are to its west, while Kairaoa, Tarakarawa, and Kawantetua are to its south.

Populated places in Kiribati